Phalonidia squalida is a species of moth of the family Tortricidae. It is found in Ecuador and Brazil (from Minas Gerais south to Paraná and Santa Catarina).

References

Moths described in 1983
Phalonidia